The Porcupine Islands are an archipelago of five islands that lie in the Mount Desert Narrows of Frenchman Bay in Bar Harbor, Maine. The Porcupine Islands consist of Sheep Porcupine Island, Burnt Porcupine Island, Rum Key, Long Porcupine Island, and Bald Porcupine Island. Bar Island, which is part of the same geological formation, is occasionally considered a part of the Porcupines as well. All of the islands, except for Burnt Porcupine, are maintained by the National Park Service through Acadia National Park (which is situated on the larger Mount Desert Island that the archipelago comes off of). The islands also serve as nesting grounds for various sea birds, like bald eagles. The islands can be accessed through sea kayaking (or canoeing) or through local boat tours out to them.

History 
The Porcupine Islands served as a hiding place for Frenchmen, during the French and Indian War, who were waiting to attack British ships that came through the area. During Prohibition, rum runners ran back and forth from Canada to the United States, and hid the smuggled rum on Rum Key.

Etymology 
The name “Porcupine Islands” has been used to describe the islands since the late 1700s, and comes from the rounded shape of the islands and the puffy and needle-y appearance that the jagged pine trees give them.

References 

Bar Harbor, Maine
Islands of Maine